Hamilton Richardson (October 17, 1820 – September 22, 1906) was an American businessman from Janesville, Wisconsin who spent one year (1864) as a member of the Wisconsin State Assembly and six years (1877–1882) as a Republican member of the Wisconsin State Senate from Rock County, Wisconsin.

References 

1820 births
1906 deaths
Businesspeople from Wisconsin
Republican Party members of the Wisconsin State Assembly
Politicians from Janesville, Wisconsin
Republican Party Wisconsin state senators
19th-century American politicians
19th-century American businesspeople